"Supernature" is the title track of Cerrone's 1977 album Supernature (Cerrone III). Along with the tracks "Give Me Love" and "Love Is Here", the song reached number one on the US disco/dance charts early in 1978. The single crossed over to both the Billboard Hot 100, where it peaked at number 70, and the soul charts, where it peaked at number 72. In August 1978, it peaked at number 8 in the UK Singles Chart after heavy use in the first series of The Kenny Everett Video Show.

Background
The lyrics were written by a young Lene Lovich, though she was not credited. The song has an environmental theme, imagining a future in which the use of artificial chemicals in agriculture has caused "creatures down below" to emerge and "take their sweet revenge" against mankind.

Reception
Pitchfork named it the 187th best song of the 1970s, saying it "introduced an unprecedented strain of dystopian disco dread. Neither Kraftwerk nor Berlin-era Bowie had an immediate international dancefloor impact as profound as "Supernature". As the track grows more sinister, mutant monsters take their revenge until humanity reverts to a primitive state where it must once again earn its place."

Charts

1 J. Garraud & D. Tenaglia Mixes

Cover versions
It was covered by Erasure in 1989, released with their single "You Surround Me". 
It was also covered by The Time Frequency in 1994 for their debut album, Dominator.

Popular culture
An instrumental edit of the song is used in Gaspar Noé's 2018 film Climax, being used for its opening choreography.
 The band Goldfrapp named their third studio album after the song.
TK Maxx used the song in their Christmas 2022 TV advertising campaign.

See also
List of number-one dance singles of 1978 (U.S.)
List of RPM number-one dance singles of 1978

References

1977 songs
1977 singles
1978 singles
Disco songs
Environmental songs